Novate may refer to several places in Lombardy, Italy:

Novate Brianza, a civil parish of Merate, in the Province of Lecco
Novate Mezzola, a municipality in the Province of Sondrio
Novate Milanese, a municipality in the Province of Milan